The Deutsche Gesellschaft zum Bau und Betrieb von Endlagern für Abfallstoffe mbH (DBE) (The German Society for the construction and operation of waste repositories) is founded in 1979 and based in Peine. The company employs approximately 570 employees and is for 75% owned by the Gesellschaft für Nuklear-Service (GNS).

DBE is responsible for planning, construction and operation of the facilities repository for radioactive waste Morsleben, Schacht Konrad and the Salt dome Gorleben for securing and disposal of radioactive waste on behalf of the Federal Republic of Germany.

DBE Technology GmbH
The DBE Technology GmbH is a 100% subsidiary of the DBE. The DBE Technology GmbH was founded in 2000 to the powers of the DBE by the federal government outside the tasks in national and international projects with a focus on management of radioactive waste to and use. The company's headquarters is in Peine (Lower Saxony).

See also
Deep geological repository

References

External links
Homepage der DBE
Homepage der DBE TECHNOLOGY GmbH

Companies based in Lower Saxony
Nuclear waste companies
Nuclear technology companies of Germany
Waste companies established in 1979
German companies established in 1979